The International Review of Economics & Finance is a peer-reviewed academic journal that covers research in theoretical and empirical international economics, macroeconomics and financial economics. The journal was established in 1992 and is published by Elsevier. It publishes academic research papers analyzing the real and the financial sectors of open and closed economies.

Abstracting and indexing 
The journal is abstracted and indexed by ABI/Inform, Journal of Economic Literature, and the Social Sciences Citation Index. According to the Journal Citation Reports, the journal has a 2020 impact factor of 2.52.

References

External links
 

Elsevier academic journals

Economics journals
Finance journals
Publications established in 1992
English-language journals